Michele Columbu (8 February 1914 – 10 July 2012) was an Italian politician and writer from Ollolai, Sardinia.

For decades, between World War II and the 1970s he was the leader of the Sardinian Action Party (PSd'Az), a Sardinian nationalist party calling for detachment from Italy and fiercely contesting the presence of NATO military bases in Sardinia. He was elected into the European Parliament in 1984.

He wrote a collection of short stories, L'aurora è lontana (1968), and the essay collection Senza un perché.

References

1914 births
2012 deaths
People from the Province of Nuoro
Italian male writers
Mayors of Cagliari